Balicki (feminine Balicka) is a Polish surname. Notable people with the surname include:

 Cezary Balicki (born 1958), Polish bridge player
 Gabriela Balicka-Iwanowska (1871–1962), Polish botanist
 Jan Wojciech Balicki (1869–1948), Polish Roman Catholic priest
 Marek Balicki, Polish politician, Minister of Health under Leszek Miller  
 Ron Balicki (born 1963), American actor
 Zygmunt Balicki (1858–1916), Polish sociologist

Polish-language surnames